Maharagama is an outer suburb of Colombo, Sri Lanka on the High-Level (A4) Road about  from the centre of the commercial capital. It developed rapidly in the 1980s as a dormitory suburb. Governed by the Maharagama Urban Council, the town possesses facilities like supermarkets, department stores, clothing, food and beverages shops to fulfill the needs of citizens.

There are number of bus routes passing the area and starting from the suburb that connect Maharagama to all the suburbs. The Sri Lanka Transport Board has a depot in Maharagama.

Maharagama Urban Council

Zone
 Mirihana
 Madivela
 Thalawathugoda
 Kottawa
 Pannipitiya
 Maharagama
 Godigamuwa

Demographics
According to the census of 2012, the demographics of Maharagama by religion and  ethnicity is as follows.

Vesak Pandol
Maharagama trade union, constructs a Vesak Pandol (a temporary huge electronically lit structure depicting the life of the Buddha) annually during the Vesak season. This attracts so many people from around the country, and one of the most recognized Pandols from whole of Sri Lanka.

Important places around Maharagama
 National Youth Services Council
 National Institute of Education (NIE), Sri Lanka
 National Cancer Institute (NCI)/Apeksha Hospital
 Sri Vajiragnana Dharmayatanaya (Bhikkhu Training Center)
 National Teachers' Training College
 National Ayurvedic Hospital
 Boralesgamuwa Lake
 University of Sri Jayewardenepura
 National Dental Institute
 Sri Jawardenapura National Hospital
 Arpico Super Center, Navinna
 Ghafooriyya Arabic College, Maharagama

Schools in Maharagama
 Buwanekaba Maha Vidyalaya
 Central College-Maharagama
 Dharmashoka Kanista Vidyalaya
 Ghafooriya Arabic College
 JMC International School
 President's College, Maharagama 
 Royal Institute International School
 Vidyakara Balika Maha Vidyalaya

Public transport

Railway
Trains starting from Colombo Fort stop at Maharagama Railway Station and nearby Nawinna Railway Station. The stations lie on the Kelani Valley Line, with local trains to Colombo Fort, Maradana, and Avissawella.

Maharagama Railway Station is in the Pamunuwa area.

Currently the Kelani Valley Line serves an increasingly urbanizing population between Colombo Fort and Maharagama. Though capacity increased through broad-gauging the line, services face limitations due to sharp curves and the illegal construction on the sides of the track between Colombo and Maharagama.

Bus routes
Maharagama, which is in the middle of few important areas, has bus routes that access to the suburb centre.

Bus routes heading via Maharagama to/from Colombo: (via High Level Rd, Nugegoda and Kirulapona)
138    - Kottawa / Homagama
138/2  - Mattegoda
138/3  - Rukmalgama
138/4  - Athurugiriya
122    - Avissawella / Ratnapura
125    - Padukka / Ingiriya

Local bus routes terminating at Maharagama:
138    - Colombo (Pettah)
112    - Kotahena
119    - Dehiwala (via Boralesgamuwa and Bellanwila)
119    - Nugegoda
993    - Malabe
122/1  - Avissawella (by Sri Lanka Transport Board - SLTB)
123    - Athurugiriya
124    - Ihalabope
128/1  - Moonamalewaththa
125/1  - Ingiriya/Padukka
129    - Moragahahena (by SLTB)
192    - Moratuwa
280    - Horana
341    - Piliyandala
341/1  - Katuwawala
341/2  - Bokundara
345    - Katuwawala (via Government Cancer Institute)
990    - Vidyala Junction (via Dambahena / Weera Mawatha)
990/1 - Dambahena
212    - Sri Jayewardenepure Hospital (Nawarohala)
991    - Sri Jayewardenepure Hospital (Nawarohala)
994    - Hokandara (via Polwatta)
996    - Katukurunda
212/341    - Bokundara (via Makuludoowa, Arawwala & Moraketiya)

Long-distance bus service via Maharagama to/from Colombo:

99     - Badulla / Welimada / Passara
122    - Ratnapura / Embilipitiya / Suriyawewa
57/16  - Anuradhapura
48/16  - Polonnaruwa 
02/16/15 - Mannar
02/16/57 - Jaffna
16/48 - Batticalo

Long-distance bus service terminating at Maharagama operated by the SLTB:
02 - Galle / Matara (Normal Service)
EX 001 - Galle / Matara (Luxury Service via the Southern Expressway)
69/122 - Kandy
16/122 - Kandy
17/57 - Anuradhapura 
16/79 - Nuwaraeliya
16/15 - Mullathiw
99 - Pambahinna-(Sabaragamuwa University of Sri Lanka)

References

External links
http://www.nysc.lk/ National Youth Services Council
https://web.archive.org/web/20120109212828/http://www.ncisl.lk/ National Cancer Institute
https://web.archive.org/web/20111112135050/http://www.vajiragnana.lk/sasana_sin.html Siri Vajiragnana Dharmayathanaya
Google Map of Maharagama

Populated places in Colombo District